Raika (Reyka) is a village and former Mehwa (petty princely state) in Vadodara Taluka of Vadodara district of Gujarat, western India.

History
The non-salute state was the major one of the three Dorka states (part of the Pandu Mehwas, under the colonial Rewa Kantha Agency), the other two being Donka itself and Angadh. It was ruled by Rajput Chieftains and covered three square miles with a population of 474 in 1901, yielding a state revenue of 3,609 Rupees (1903-4; nearly all from land) and paying 443 Rupees tribute to the Gaikwar Baroda State.

External links
 Imperial Gazetteer, on DSAL - Rewa Kantha

Princely states of Gujarat
Rajput princely states
Villages in Vadodara district